All I Need to Know may refer to:
"All I Need to Know" (Emma Bunton song)
All I Need to Know (album), by Kenny Chesney
"All I Need to Know" (Kenny Chesney song), its title track
 Bette Midler song, also known under the title Don't Know Much